Shae Jones (born July 27, 1978 in Kansas City, Missouri) is an American R&B singer. She was discovered in the late 1990s by R&B star Montell Jordan, who liked the fact that her voice did not sound like other voices.

After signing with Uptown Records, Jones' recorded her debut album Talk Show in 1998, and it had its official release on January 26, 1999. The album's lead single "Talk Show Shhh!" peaked on the Billboard Hot 100 at 88. Jones was released from her contract with Uptown and has yet to release any new material.

In addition to her solo career, Jones also appeared on Sisqó's Unleash the Dragon, Gina Thompson's If You Only Knew, Tamia's A Nu Day, Whitney Houston's The Greatest Hits and the Phil Collins tribute Urban Renewal.

Discography

References

Living people
1978 births
African-American women singer-songwriters
Midwest hip hop musicians
American rhythm and blues singer-songwriters
Musicians from Kansas City, Missouri
Universal Records artists
Singer-songwriters from Missouri
ASCAP composers and authors
20th-century African-American women singers